Dan Parry is a British Mix/Recording engineer. His career began in 2001 working at Soul II Soul Studios in Camden Town, before joining Metropolis studios in 2004.

Progressing through the ranks at Metropolis Studios Parry eventually became full-time assistant engineer to Mix Engineer, Tom Elmhirst who was based at Metropolis at the time. Parry spent the next five years assisting Elmhirst on artists such as Amy Winehouse, Adele, and Mark Ronson.

In 2010 Lady Gaga's The Fame Monster LP was nominated for a Grammy Award for Album of the Year. Parry's involvement on a few tracks on the album (credited as "Engineer, Tracking") was recognised in the nomination. The album did not win in this category.

Following his work assisting Elmhirst on the mixing of four tracks on the Adele album 21 (credited as "Assisted by") and additional vocal recording on one of those tracks (credited as "Additional Vocals Recorded by") Parry was included in the nominations for "Album of the Year" at the 54th Grammys. The album won this category.

Career highlights to date

|-
! scope="row" rowspan="1"|2011
|The Fame Monster (Lady Gaga)
|rowspan="3"|Album of the Year
|
|-
! scope="row" rowspan="1"|2012
|21 (Adele)
|
|-
! scope="row" rowspan="1"|2015
|In the Lonely Hour (Sam Smith)
|
|-

Recent credits
 2014: Paloma Faith -  A Perfect Contradiction
 2014: Sam Smith -  In the Lonely Hour
 2014: Sohn -  Tremors

References

External links
Dan Parry homepage

British audio engineers
Grammy Award winners
Living people
Year of birth missing (living people)